In mathematics, the Fejér kernel is a summability kernel used to express the effect of Cesàro summation on Fourier series. It is a non-negative kernel, giving rise to an approximate identity. It is named after the Hungarian mathematician Lipót Fejér (1880–1959).

Definition
The Fejér kernel has many equivalent definitions. We outline three such definitions below: 

1) The traditional definition expresses the Fejér kernel  in terms of the Dirichlet kernel: 

where 
 
is the kth order Dirichlet kernel.

2) The Fejér kernel  may also be written in a closed form expression as follows

This closed form expression may be derived from the definitions used above. The proof of this result goes as follows.

First, we use the fact that the Dirichet kernel may be written as:
 
Hence, using the definition of the Fejér kernel above we get:

Using the trigonometric identity: 

Hence it follows that:

3) The Fejér kernel can also be expressed as:

Properties
The Fejér kernel is a positive summability kernel.

Convolution

Since , we have , which is Cesàro summation of Fourier series. 

By Young's convolution inequality, 

Additionally, if , then
 a.e.
Since  is finite, so the result holds for other  spaces,  as well.

If  is continuous, then the convergence is uniform, yielding a proof of the Weierstrass theorem.

This follows from writing , which depends only on the Fourier coefficients.
 A second consequence is that if  exists a.e., then  a.e., since  Cesàro means  converge to the original sequence limit if it exists.

See also
 Fejér's theorem
 Dirichlet kernel
 Gibbs phenomenon
 Charles Jean de la Vallée-Poussin

References

Fourier series